Dębe may refer to the following places:
Dębe, Czarnków-Trzcianka County in Greater Poland Voivodeship (west-central Poland)
Dębe, Legionowo County in Masovian Voivodeship (east-central Poland)
Dębe, Sokołów County in Masovian Voivodeship (east-central Poland)
Dębe, Kalisz County in Greater Poland Voivodeship (west-central Poland)

Technology
DEBE (program) Utility program for IBM DOS/360.